Rodolfo T. "Rod" Reyes (July 23, 1935 – April 14, 2016) was a Filipino media executive. He was the founding publisher and editor-in-chief of Manila Standard, from its inception in 1987 until 1990.

Career

Newspaper
Reyes began working in the newspaper industry at the age of 12. He was a sports writer of the Manila Times at the age of 16, later designated as an investigative reporter.

In 1961, Reyes accorded the Journalist of the Year due to his exposé on heroin drug syndicates in the suburbs of Malabon disguising as a drug addict. His exposé went into a full-length film entitled "Sa Piling ng mga Sugapa", on which Matt Ranillo III portrayed his role. Gil Portes was the director of the movie.

He was also awarded as the Ten Outstanding Young Men awardee and a Nieman Fellowship from the Harvard University. From the Times (where he was also a news editor), he moved to the Manila Chronicle (as the editor-in-chief until the closure due to martial law), TV Times, Celebrity, Ginoo and Home Companion magazines.

In 1987, Reyes planned to set up a newspaper, with the help of the Elizalde family. He founded Manila Standard on February 11, 1987, with 19 pages on the maiden issue. He was the first publisher, editor-in-chief and chief operating officer of the paper from the first issue until 1990. Reyes also writes a column in the same newspaper, entitled "A Journalist's Memoirs" every Wednesday, of which he detailed his experiences both as a newspaper and broadcast executive.

Broadcasting
Reyes then moved to the Chronicle's sister company ABS-CBN, where he served as an executive vice president and news director in the 1960s. This was Reyes' first foray in the broadcasting industry. Reyes later returned to the network as the senior vice president of the news and current affairs division in 1990, 4 years after the network's reopening, months after the People Power Revolution.

He also served as a general manager and executive vice president of the GMA Radio Television Arts (when the Gozon-Duavit-Jimenez triumvirate took over the operations of Channel 7 from the Stewart family) in 1974, and the Maharlika Broadcasting System (now known as People's Television Network) in the 1980s. He was also a member of the Manila International Film Festival organizing committee from 1983 to 1984.

He is also a counsellor of the Philippine embassy based in Washington D.C.

Reyes was appointed as the Press Secretary from July 1992 until May 1993 under the Fidel V. Ramos administration. Under his watch, Reyes strengthened the presidential coverage by setting-up the Presidential News Desk. It was later reappointed by then-president Joseph Estrada and served from June 1998 to April 2000. He was later appointed as chief of the Manila Economic and Cultural Office - Taiwan.

Death
Reyes died at the Asian Hospital and Medical Center in Muntinlupa on the evening of April 14, 2016 due to heart failure. He was 80.

References

1935 births
2016 deaths
ABS-CBN people
Filipino media executives
Filipino newspaper publishers (people)
Presidential spokespersons (Philippines)
People from Manila
GMA Network (company) people
Estrada administration cabinet members
Ramos administration cabinet members